George Benjamin Buksar (August 12, 1926 – February 22, 2011) was an American football fullback and linebacker in the National Football League for the Washington Redskins and the Baltimore Colts.  He also played for the Chicago Hornets of the All-America Football Conference.  Buksar played college football at Purdue University and the University of San Francisco and was drafted in the tenth round of the 1949 NFL Draft by the Los Angeles Rams.

References

http://www.pro-football-reference.com/players/B/BuksGe20.htm

1926 births
2011 deaths
American football fullbacks
American football linebackers
Purdue Boilermakers football players
San Francisco Dons football players
Chicago Hornets players
Baltimore Colts (1947–1950) players
Washington Redskins players
People from Whiting, Indiana
Players of American football from Indiana